A psammoma body is a round collection of calcium, seen microscopically. The term is derived from the Greek word ψάμμος (psámmos), meaning "sand".

Cause
Psammoma bodies are associated with the papillary (nipple-like) histomorphology and are thought to arise from,
 Infarction and calcification of papillae tips.
 Calcification of intralymphatic tumor thrombi.

Association with lesions
Psammoma bodies are commonly seen in certain tumors such as:
 Papillary thyroid carcinoma
 Papillary renal cell carcinoma
 Ovarian papillary serous cystadenoma and cystadenocarcinoma
 Endometrial adenocarcinomas (Papillary serous carcinoma ~3%-4%)
 Meningiomas, in the central nervous system
 Peritoneal and Pleural Mesothelioma
 Somatostatinoma (pancreas)
 Prolactinoma of the pituitary 
Glucagonoma
 Micropapillary subtype of Lung Adenocarcinoma

Benign lesions

Psammoma bodies may be seen in:
 Endosalpingiosis
 Psammomatous melanotic schwannoma
 Melanocytic nevus

Appearance
Psammoma bodies usually have a laminar appearance, are circular, acellular and basophilic.

References

External links

Slides:
 Meningioma
 Thyroid cancer
 Endometriosis (peritoneum)
 Video of psammoma bodies in meningioma

Histopathology